The Maya is a river in Khabarovsk Krai, Russia. The name originated in an Evenki word for a basket of birch bark. 

The river flows across an uninhabited area. The Maya is a destination for watersports, such as rafting.

Course
The Maya is a left tributary of the Uda. It has its origin in the southern slopes of the Stanovoy Range, at the confluence of rivers Ayumkan and Kun-Manyo. In its upper course the river flows fast roughly in an ESE direction across taiga-covered mountains within a clearly defined valley. After crossing a ridge, the Maya flows along the intermontane basin that limits the northeastern flank of the Maya Range (Майский хребет). Its channel divides into branches, forming islands. At the eastern end of the range the river turns southeastwards and enters a floodplain, slowing down and flowing among marshes for a relatively short distance. Finally it meets the Uda near Udskoye village,  from its mouth.

The main tributaries of the Maya are the Yalun, Ayumkan and Edegu-Chaidakh (Эдэгу-Чайдах) from the right, and the Ataga, Salga, Limnu, Cheborkan and Kononny from the left.

Fauna
Lenok, taimen, whitefish, burbot and grayling are among the common fish species in the waters of the Maya river.

See also
List of rivers of Russia

References

External links 
Река Мая - Хабаровский край

Rivers of Khabarovsk Krai
Drainage basins of the Sea of Okhotsk